Freedom Suite may refer to:
 Freedom Suite (The Rascals album), 1969
 Freedom Suite (Sonny Rollins album), 1958 
Freedom Suite (David S. Ware album), 2002